Tümer is a Turkish male given name and surname. Notable people with the name include:

 Tümer Metin (born 1974), Turkish footballer
 Nejat Tümer, Turkish admiral
 Murat Tümer, one of the founders of the Turkish rock band Mavi Sakal 

Turkish masculine given names
Turkish-language surnames